The Shanghai Yangtze River Tunnel and Bridge is a bridge–tunnel complex across the south fork of the Yangtze River near the river mouth in Shanghai.  The tunnel connects the Pudong District of Shanghai on the south bank of the river with Changxing Island, while the bridge connects Changxing Island with Chongming Island. In combination with the Chongqi Bridge (opened in December 2011), which connects Chongming Island to the north bank of the Yangtze, the bridge–tunnel complex forms the final crossing of the Yangtze before it empties into the East China Sea.

The bridge and tunnel were built from 2005 to 2009 at a cost of 12.6 billion yuan (US$1.84 billion), and opened on 31 October 2009.

Tunnel

The Shanghai Yangtze River Tunnel starts on the south bank of the Yangtze at Wuhaogou, Pudong and ends in the south of Changxing Island. The lower level is reserved for a future Shanghai Metro line, Chongming Line.

Bridge

The Shanghai Yangtze River Bridge starts at the tunnel exit, crosses Changxing Island at ground level, then crosses to Chongming Island, ending at Chenjia Town.

It consists of two long viaducts with a higher cable-stayed section in the middle to allow the passage of ships.
The overall shape of the bridge is not linear but slightly sigmoid ("S" shaped).

The span arrangement is 92+258+730+258+72 m.

See also

 Yangtze River bridges and tunnels
 Hangzhou Bay Bridge, a bridge across the Hangzhou Bay connecting Jiangsu and Zhejiang provinces.
 Donghai Bridge, a bridge from Shanghai to the island of Yangshan and the Yangshan Deepwater Port in Hangzhou Bay.
 Yangpu Bridge, a cable-stayed bridge across Huangpu River in Shanghai.
 Lupu Bridge, an arch bridge across Huangpu River in Shanghai.

References

External links
Shanghai Yantze River Bridge&Tunnel Project Info Website  
The world's largest bridge tunnel opened to traffic in Shanghai
New City a model for the future
New bridge can cope with an earthquake
Pudong to Chongming in 20mins
扬子晚报：崇启大桥通过评估
长江隧桥项目简介 
SMG：采用最新科技 上海长江隧道做足安全文章
新闻午报：上海长江大桥主塔封顶

Bridge–tunnels in Asia
Road transport in Shanghai
Road tunnels in China
Bridges in Shanghai
Bridges over the Yangtze River
Cable-stayed bridges in China
2009 establishments in China